Barbara Taylor Bowman (born October 30, 1928) is an American early childhood education expert/advocate, professor, and author. Her areas of expertise include early childhood care/education, educational equity for minority and low-income children, as well as intergenerational family support and roles. She has served on several boards and was the co-founder of Erikson Institute, where she pioneered the teaching of early childhood education and administration.

Early years
Bowman was born and raised on the South Side of Chicago, Illinois, the daughter of Laura Dorothy Vaughn (née Jennings) and Robert Rochon Taylor, who was on the board of the Chicago Housing Authority. Her grandfather was architect Robert Robinson Taylor. Her parents were African-American. After receiving a B.A. degree from Sarah Lawrence College, she began teaching at the University of Chicago Laboratory Schools' nursery school, while simultaneously earning her M.A. degree in education from the University of Chicago in 1952.

Career
Lyndon Johnson's War on Poverty and the 1965 creation of Head Start inspired Bowman. The next year, with the support of businessman and philanthropist Irving B. Harris, Bowman cofounded the
Chicago School for Early Childhood Education (now known as the Erikson Institute) with child psychologist Maria Piers and social worker Lorraine Wallach. Bowman went on to serve as its president during the period of 1994 to 2001, and maintains a professorship at the institute, where she is the Irving B. Harris Professor of Child Development. The institute's Barbara T. Bowman Professor of Child Development professorship is named in her honor.

Bowman is the Chicago Public Schools' Chief Early Childhood Education Officer.  She is the past president (1980–1982) of the National Association for the Education of Young Children. Her Board memberships are many including: Business People in the Public Interest, Chicago Public Library Foundation, Great Books Foundation, High Scope Educational Foundation, Institute for Psychoanalysis, and National Board for Professional Teaching Standards. Among the many honorary degrees awarded to Bowman are those from Bank Street College, Dominican University, Governors State University, Roosevelt University, and Wheelock College. During her career, she has also served on the editorial board of Early Childhood Research Quarterly, and chaired the National Academy of Sciences, National Research Council's Committee on Early Childhood Pedagogy.

Personal life
Bowman was married to the late James E. Bowman, renowned pathologist and geneticist of African American descent, and the first black resident at St. Luke's Hospital. They have one daughter, Valerie Jarrett, who was Senior Advisor and Assistant to the President for Intergovernmental Affairs and Public Liaison in the Obama administration. Their granddaughter, Laura Jarrett, graduated from Harvard Law School in 2010 and married Tony Balkissoon, who is also a lawyer and the son of Ontario MP Bas Balkissoon, in June 2012.

Awards
 Chicago Association for the Education of Young Children Outstanding Service to Children Award
 Chicago League of Women Voters' Civic Contribution Award
 Harold W. McGraw, Jr. Prize in Education, 2005
 Mercedes Award
 National Black Child Development Institute Leadership Award
 Voices for Illinois' Children Start Early Award
 Chicago Institute for Psychoanalysis Human Spirit Award

Partial bibliography
Books
 -, & Attinasi, J. (1994). Cultural diversity and academic achievement Urban education program. (Oak Brook, IL]): NCREL. 
 -, Bredekamp, S., Dodge, D. T., Epstein, A. S., & Borgia, E. (2000). Ensuring Quality and Accountability Through Leadership Tape 1, Curriculum and Assessment. Washington, D.C.: Head Start Bureau, The National Head Start Child Development Institute. 
 -, Donovan, S., & Burns, M. S. (2001). Eager to learn: Educating our preschoolers. Washington, DC: National Academy Press. 
 - (2002). Love to read: Essays in developing and enhancing early literacy skills of African American children. [Washington, D.C.]: National Black Child Development Institute. 
 -, & Moore, E. K. (2006). School readiness and social-emotional development: Perspectives on cultural diversity. Washington, DC: National Black Child Development Institute.

References

External links
 Photo of Barbara T. Bowman, 2006

African-American writers
African-American women writers
American women writers
Sarah Lawrence College alumni
University of Chicago alumni
Writers from Chicago
Early childhood education in the United States
1928 births
Living people
Educators from Illinois
American women educators
Founders of educational institutions
Women founders
21st-century African-American people
21st-century African-American women
20th-century African-American people
20th-century African-American women